David Kaufman (born July 23, 1961) is an American actor. He is best known for his voice roles of Dexter Douglas in Freakazoid!, Jimmy Olsen in Superman: The Animated Series, the titular protagonist in Danny Phantom, Aldrin in The Buzz on Maggie, Marty McFly in Back to the Future, and Stuart Little in the animated series of the same name. He often is a voice double for Michael J. Fox.

Early life
Kaufman was born and raised in St. Louis, Missouri. His father is Jewish, while his mother is Catholic. Kaufman began acting at a young age in his hometown when his kindergarten teacher handed him the plum lead role of Santa Claus in the class Christmas play.

At the age of 18, Kaufman moved from St. Louis to attend UCLA; he was a student in the Department of Theater Arts.

Career
Since his college years, Kaufman has studied and worked extensively as a professional actor in films and television.

He has worked with the Daly family of actors on several projects: He worked with Tim Daly on Superman: The Animated Series and its subsequent spin-offs, playing Jimmy Olsen. He also appeared with Daly in the series Wings in 1995 with his wife Lisa; the two portrayed a couple whose wedding Daly's character Joe and his fiancée Helen crash.  He worked with Tim's sister, Tyne Daly on Kids Like These and will join Tim again in Justice League: Doom, reprising his role of Jimmy Olsen.

Kaufman has also worked as a commercial actor. One of his most prominent roles was as a dancing stockboy in a 1989 commercial for Hi-C Ecto Cooler.

Personal life
On June 30, 1990, Kaufman married actress Lisa Picotte; together, they have two children who are also actors, including Grace Kaufman and Henry Kaufman.

Filmography

Television series
 Down to Earth (TBS) - Duane Preston
 Haunted Lives: True Ghost Stories (CBS) - Tim Clanton
 Dweebs (CBS) - Morley
 Presidio Med (CBS)
Kaufman has guest-starring roles on such series as:
 Animaniacs - Steven Seagull
 Boston Legal
 The Closer
 ER
 Stargate SG-1 - Mark Gilmor
 The West Wing
 CSI: Crime Scene Investigation
 Touched by an Angel
 Citizen Baines
 Hollywood Off-Ramp
 Step by Step - Devon
 Wings - Groom
 Matlock - Danny Hayes / Mark Randall
 Night Court - Spiros
 Just the Ten of Us
 Highway to Heaven
 Rocket Power - Cameraman
 Simon and Simon
 Star Wars: The Clone Wars - Jaybo Hood
 Hawaii Five-O

Animated series
 Daniel "Danny" Fenton - Nickelodeon's hit animated series Danny Phantom
 Aldrin Pesky - Disney Channel's The Buzz on Maggie.

Kaufman lent his voice to several well-known animated series, including Jimmy Olsen from Superman: The Animated Series/Superman: Brainiac Attacks, and Justice League, and Dexter Douglas from Freakazoid, as well as filling in for Michael J. Fox in both the roles of Marty McFly on Back to the Future and Stuart Little in HBO's Stuart Little. He voiced Human Torch in Ultimate Spider-Man, and reprised the role for both Marvel: Ultimate Alliance 2, and The Avengers: Earth's Mightiest Heroes. Kaufman also provided the voice of Arik, a one-time character in the acclaimed Nickelodeon animated series The Legend of Korra.

Films
 Your Mother Wears Combat Boots 
 Pearl Harbor
 Enchanted
 Prom Night - Businessman
 Tom Sawyer
 Green Lantern: Emerald Knights - Rubyn
 Atlantis: Milo's Return - Milo James Thatch (sharing the role with James Arnold Taylor)
 Role of a Lifetime
 Red Riding Hood (experimental musical comedy, that was the brain-storm of Director Randal Kleiser)
 From the Earth to the Moon (produced by Tom Hanks)
 The Last Prostitute (starring with Sonia Braga)
 Kids Like These (starring with Tyne Daly and Richard Crenna)
 Justice League: Doom

Commercials
 AT&T (starring with Ray Walston)
 Pepsi (starring with Cindy Crawford)
 Blockbuster (starring with Magic Johnson)
 Kid Cuisine (the voice of K. C. Penguin)
as well as spots for Honda, Hi-C Ecto-Cooler, Maxwell House, Dentyne, Chili's, Midas, Wendy's, Twiglets and British Petroleum, among others.

Stage work
Kaufman has earned several Los Angeles area critics' awards and nominations.

He has been a member of the West Coast Ensemble in Los Angeles for over ten years, performing such varied roles as:

 Skeets Miller in Floyd Collins
 Prosecutor Gilmer in To Kill a Mockingbird
 George Lewis in Kaufman and Hart's Once in a Lifetime
 Orestes in Electra
 Tyler in Sondheim and Furth's Merrily We Roll Along
 Ronnie Shaughnessy in The House of Blue Leaves
 Callimaco in Machiavelli's The Mandrake
 Eugene Jerome in Neil Simon's Biloxi Blues
 Paul Palmer in James Duff's A Quarrel of Sparrows at The Court Theatre in Los Angeles
 Stewie in the premiere of Richard Greenberg's Night and Her Stars at South Coast Repertory.

Video games
 Max Justice, Nitro Byrne in Hot Wheels Velocity X
 Danny Phantom in: Nicktoons Unite, Nicktoons Winners Cup Racing,  Nicktoons: Battle for Volcano Island, Nicktoons: Attack of the Toybots, Nicktoons: Globs of Doom, Nicktoons Nitro, Nickelodeon All-Star Brawl, Nickelodeon Extreme Tennis, and Nickelodeon Kart Racers 3: Slime Speedway
 Johnny Storm / Human Torch: Ultimate Spider-Man
 Marek in Broken Age
 Additional Voices in The Frozen Wilds DLC of Horizon Zero Dawn

References

External links
 

1961 births
Living people
American male film actors
American male stage actors
American male television actors
American male video game actors
American male voice actors
Jewish American male actors
Male actors from St. Louis
UCLA Film School alumni
21st-century American Jews